Unintended may refer to:

 "Unintended" (song), a 1999 single by Muse
 The Unintended, a Canadian indie supergroup

See also
Unintended pregnancy